Dhangadhi is a sub-metropolitan city and the district headquarters of Kailali District in Sudurpashchim Province of Nepal.Dhangadhi is also the capital of Sudurpashchim Province. It shares a border with Uttar Pradesh, India in the south, Godawari and Gauriganga Municipality in the North, Kailari Rural Municipality in the east and Kanchanpur District in the west. Dhangadhi is a sub-metropolis divided into 19 wards. It has a population of about 147,181 and thus is the 10th biggest city of Nepal. It is one of the major cities of Far - West Province of Nepal along with Mahendranagar.

Dhangadhi was established in 1976. It became the first sub-metropolitan city in the far-west after it was upgraded to a sub-metropolis from municipality status on 18 September 2015 as the village development committees Fulbari and Urma were merged into Dhangadhi. There is a fable. Rana Tharu of Dhangadhi used to bury their wealth in the ground due to the fear of robbers. That is why the name of Dhangadhi remained Dhangadhi.

Transportation

Road

Dhangadhi is well connected with other major cities of Nepal and the Indian state of Uttar Pradesh. Indian and Nepali nationals may cross the international border without restrictions, however there is a customs checkpoint for goods and third country nationals. Local transport includes Cycle Rickshaws, Taxis and Public City Buses.

Air
Dhangadhi Airport is located 10 km from the administrative center and about 660 kilometers west of Kathmandu.  The runway has been extended to 1,524 metres (5,000 ft) length and blacktopped to accommodate Fokker 100 aircraft.

Demographics

Languages 

At the time of the 2011 Census of Nepal, 36% of the population in the City spoke Tharu, 31% Doteli, 22% Nepali, 2% Hindi, 2% Maithili, 1% Magar, and 6% spoke other languages as their first language.

Ethnic groups 

The largest ethnic group is Tharu, who makes 37% of the population,  Chhetris with 21% comes to second place, while the Hill Brahman population is 17%. Other groups in Dhangadhi includes the Thakuri (6%), Kami (6%), Magar (3%) and others various ethnic gropups makes(12%) of the population.

Climate
Dhanghadi has a monsoon-influenced humid subtropical climate (Cwa according to the Köppen climate classification).

Sports 
There is Dhangadhi Stadium,Covered Hall,SSP Cricket ground,Fapla International Cricket Ground in Dhangadhi.

Dhangadhi Premier League 

The Dhangadhi Premier League (DPL) is a franchise Twenty20 cricket league in Nepal. The league was founded by the Dhangadhi Cricket Academy and Sudur Pashchim Academy in 2017.The DPL season runs between the months of March and April, with each team playing 5 matches in round-robin format; the top 4 teams with the best record qualify for the Playoffs and culminates in the final.The current DPL title holders are Team Chauraha Dhangadhi, who won the 2017 season and 2018 Season.

Dhangadhi F.C. 
Dhangadhi F.C. is a Nepalese professional franchise football club based in Dhangadhi, Sudurpashchim Province, that plays in the Nepal Super League (NSL), the top flight franchise football league in Nepal.In the first season, the club ended the tournament as runners-up, after losing to Kathmandu Rayzers in the final.The club was one of the seven teams to participate in the inaugural NSL season.The name, logo and owner of the club were introduced on 14 March 2021.

Media 
Joshi Talkies and STS Cinema are two cinema halls in Dhangadhi.The city has some radio stations:

 Dinesh FM 93.8 MHz
 Dhangadhi FM 90.5 MHz
 Pashchim Today 98.8 MHz
 Khaptad FM 98.2MHz
 Radio Jana Awaj 89.4 MHz
 Radio Daily Mail 94.6 MHz
 Radio Active FM 97.2MHz

Places of interest 

 Shivapuri Dham Temple
 Behada Baba Temple
 Dhangadhi Fun City
 Tikapur Park is two hour's drive east
 Shuklaphanta National Park is an hour's drive west
 Karnali River is two hour's east from Dhangadhi
 Godawari north from Dhangadhi

Education

Colleges
 Kailali Multiple Campus (Campus Road) 
Kailali Model Higher Secondary School, Utter Behadi
 Sudur Paschimanchal Campus (Sontoshi  tole)
 Aishwarya Multiple Campus was established in 2063 B.S. & has been conditioning the bachelor level programs with affiliation to Tribhuwan University, Kirtipur, Kathmandu, Nepal. The programs currently offered are: B.Sc. (Bachelor of Science), BBS (Bachelor of Business Studies).It is the one of the best college of Nepal which provides quality education. 
 Dhangadhi Engineering College was established in 2000 BCE & has been conducting the bachelor level programs with affiliation to Pokhara University, Nepal. The programs currently offered are: Bachelor of Computer Engineering (B.E Computer), Bachelor of Computer Application (B.C.A), Bachelor of Business Administration (B.B.A), and Bachelor of Civil Engineering (B.E Civil).
 Nepal Western Academy is another renowned college located in Santoshi Tole. It is affiliated to Pokhara University. Currently it has been running BBA BI and BHM programs.
 National Academy of science and technology (Uttar Behendi)   
 Western International Business School (LN chowk). Currently it has been running BBA and MBA. It is affiliated to Delta International University of New Orleans USA

Schools
• Shree Tribhuvan Secondary School, Borandadi-3, Dhangadhi
Kailali Vidya Niketan (Dhangadhi-8, shiksyanagar)
 Shree Milan English School
 Aristo English Boarding High School (Campus Road)
 Three Stars English Boarding School Dhangadhi-8,Kailali
 Caspian Academy English Boarding School Dhangadhi-*,kailali
 Aishwarya Vidya Niketan Higher Secondary School, Hasanpur, Kailali
 Stepping Stone English School, Chauraha-2, Dhangadhi
 Golden Jyoti English Boarding School, Jugeda, Dhangadhi
 Broad Vision International Academy, Chatakpur, Dhangadhi.
 Kailali Model Higher Secondary School, Uttarbehadi, Dhangadhi
 Panchodaya Higher Secondary School
 Green Land Public School - Dhangadhi
 Malika Higher Secondary English School
 Unique Modern Academy santoshitole-2. 
 Shree Basu Devi Higher Secondary School (dhangadhi,06, jali)
 Far West Secondary School (jai)
 Galaxy Higher Secondary School (Hasanpur)
 Emerald Academy (Dhangadhi-3, Bishalnagar)
 Manilek International School Dhangadhi-3, Chatakpur
 Doon Academy, Bhanshar Road, Dhangadhi-3, Kailali
 Glee Academy School 
 Himal Academy Dhangadhi, Chauraha-2, Dhangadhi
 Siddhartha Shishu Sadan Higher Secondary School, L.N. Chwok 
 Shree Navadurga Secondary School, Dhangadhi-2, Bhansar
 Jaycees Everest English School, Dhangadhi-2
 Western Crystal Academy  Dhangadhi-2
 Mountsaipal English Boarding School
 Crescent City School, Baiyabehadi-2, Dhangadhi
 Discovery English Boarding School Dhangadhi-8, Kantipur Tole
 Navajeevan English School, Santoshitole-2, Dhangadhi 
 Delight Boarding School
 Alliance International School, Baiyahehadi,

Health

Hospital 

 Seti Provincial Hospital, Main Road, Dhagadhi
 City Metro Hospital
 Navajeevan Hospital
 CP Hospital, Chatakpur
 Maya Metro Hospital
 Nisarga Hospital
 Dhangadhi Netralaya Eye Hospital, Chatakpur
 Joshi Medical
 NOVA Hospital
 Om Aasha Hospital, Campusroad, Dhangadhi

Notable People 

 Suman Singh, Actor
 Bhuvan Karki, Cricketer
 Biraj Bhatta, Actor
 Raju Rijal, Cricketer and the former captain of Nepal national under-19 cricket team
 Reecha Sharma, Actress, model, and video jockey
 Deepika Prasain, Actress
 Ramlal Joshi, Writer

See also 
2022 Dhangadhi municipal election
Mahendranagar
Dipayal Silgadhi

References

Municipalities in Kailali District
Nepal municipalities established in 1976
Points for exit and entry of nationals from third countries along the India–Nepal border
Populated places in Kailali District
Submetropolitan municipalities of Nepal
Transit and customs posts along the India–Nepal border